As a part of the University of Economics Ho Chi Minh City (UEH), the UEH-International School of Business (UEH-ISB) (in Vietnamese: Viện ISB) was established in 2010 with the aim of creating a world-class, modern, and dynamic educational environment.

To ensure our graduates achieve strong competence to compete in the context of globalization, UEH-ISB offers undergraduate and postgraduate programs taught completely in English and follow an international academic format. UEH-ISB has a strong partnership with Western Sydney University, Australia, as well as associations with Victoria University, Australia, UQAM and the University of Houston–Clear Lake.

The EMBA program at UEH-ISB, run as a partnership through Université du Québec à Montréal (UQÀM), is currently ranked 283 among business schools in the world.

History 

The UEH-International School of Business (UEH-ISB), was founded in 2010 by President Dr. Nguyen Dong Phong and Vice President Dr. Tran Ha Minh Quan in Ho Chi Minh City, Vietnam. The school was founded as a partnership with Western Sydney University, Australia. Students graduating from UEH-ISB's bachelor and masters programs of study receive a joint degree from UEH and from the partnership university.

UEH-ISB's faculty includes professors from America, Australia, Malaysia, Singapore, New Zealand, England, and Poland, among other countries.

Campuses and facilities 

UEH-International School of Business has currently three high-quality campuses, located at the center of Ho Chi Minh City.

 17 Pham Ngoc Thach Street, Vo Thi Sau Ward, District 3, Ho Chi Minh City
 59C Nguyen Dinh Chieu Street, Vo Thi Sau Ward, District 3, Ho Chi Minh City
 41-43 Vo Van Tan Street, Vo Thi Sau Ward , District 3, Ho Chi Minh City

Student life 

Besides academics program, UEH-ISB also provides a variety of clubs and student groups, through which students can develop their vital soft skills and cultivate practical knowledge. At UEH-ISB, students will be able to get involved in exciting and dynamic extracurricular activities. With more than 10 different clubs, you shall have the opportunity to unleash your abilities and interests; accumulate knowledge and practical experiences related to your majors; at the same time, acquire necessary social skills and expand your personal relationships.

There are a number of clubs run through UEH-ISB's main downtown Ho Chi Minh City campus, including a local chapter of Toastmasters International.

References

Universities in Ho Chi Minh City